is a fictional Japanese idol. She is a CGI composite of various features of seven existing (all now former) members of the theater/idol group AKB48.

Eguchi was announced as the group's newest member in June 2011. According to an official profile she was 16 years old, born on February 11, 1995, and from Saitama, north of Tokyo. She was featured in the Japanese magazine Weekly Playboy, and appeared in a television commercial for the confectionery company, Ezaki Glico. Suspicions arose amongst AKB48 fans and on June 19, 2011, Glico finally admitted that Eguchi was a fake created by the company, disappointing many fans. , she is no longer listed on the official website as a trainee.

CGI contributors
Atsuko Maeda (eyes)
Tomomi Itano (nose)
Mariko Shinoda (mouth)
Yuko Oshima (hair/body)
Minami Takahashi (outline)
Mayu Watanabe (eyebrows)

References

External links
Aimi Eguchi in Weekly Playboy

2011 in Japan
2011 hoaxes
AKB48
Animated characters
Fictional characters introduced in 2011
Fictional musicians
Fictional Japanese people
Hoaxes in Japan
Nonexistent people used in hoaxes